The Westphalian frank was a currency of the Kingdom of Westphalia between 1808 and 1813. It circulated alongside the Thaler, was equal to the French franc, and was subdivided into 100 Centimen.

The currency was dissolved upon being recaptured by Prussian forces and its allies in the Napoleonic Wars in 1813. 

Currencies of Germany
1808 establishments in Europe
1813 disestablishments in Europe
1800s in Germany
1810s in Germany
19th-century economic history